The 1983 Southwest Conference women's basketball tournament was held March 10–13, 1983, at Gregory Gym in Austin, Texas. 

Number 1 seed  defeated 2 seed  80-54 to win their 1st championship and receive the conference's automatic bid to the 1983 NCAA tournament.

Format and seeding 
The tournament consisted of a 9 team single-elimination tournament with the 8 and 9 seeded teams playing in a play-in game to decide the 8th spot.

Tournament

References 

Southwest Conference women's Basketball Tournament
1983 in American women's basketball
1983 in sports in Texas
Basketball competitions in Austin, Texas
College sports tournaments in Texas
Women's sports in Texas